Lorin Morgan-Richards (born February 16, 1975) is an American author, illustrator, and songwriter, primarily known for his young adult fiction and Weird West series The Goodbye Family.

In the past, Richards served as the publisher of Celtic Family Magazine, and was the founder of the Los Angeles St. David's Day Festival, one of the largest Welsh festivals of its kind in the United States.

Morgan-Richards was born in Beebetown, Ohio, and is of Swiss (Amish) and Welsh descent.

Early years
Richards was raised in an old converted one-room schoolhouse in Beebetown, Ohio, that had a well for water. His mother (a student of fine art) taught him the basics of drawing and music composition on the family pump organ. Richards also credited his imagination on the plentiful books his family owned, creative isolation, and the sheer number of animals they took care of, many of which he incorporated into his early drawings and writings.

Richards interest in Native American and American Western history began in childhood. "I remember my first book as a child was The Indians Knew by Tillie S. Pine, an early reader from 1965 explaining the cultural ways and historical resourcefulness of Native Americans and how they are applied in the sciences today."

When Richards entered second grade, he was diagnosed with a form of dyslexia that required tutoring through the ninth grade. By his early teens, he was reading and became inspired by Edward Lear, L. Frank Baum, Roald Dahl, and Lewis Carroll; helping him overcome his reading disability.

In 1990, at the age of 15, Richards wrote and produced his first film entitled The Cowboy Movie.

Theater
Between 1993 and 2003, Richards received an AA Degree in Liberal Arts at Cuyahoga Community College and credited his Anthropology Professor Mark Lewine as a mentor. During this time, Richards also achieved minor success in producing music projects containing modern dance and theater, and befriended and collaborated with artist Textbeak. "I first attended Tri-C Western campus where my focus was on Liberal Arts. At the time, I kept a journal of random thoughts, doodles, and lyrics and used the filter of music as my art. So, the bulk of my classes were in this field of study. I made connections with other artists who shared similar passions, and we were all eager to form various projects of expression. I moved to Lakewood to be closer to the performance spaces and switched to Tri-C Metro where I was awakened out of my shell by an Anthropology teacher named Dr. Mark Lewine." In 1999, Richards solo album ENKI and subsequent live production were based on Zecharia Sitchin's book The Twelfth Planet. The show premiered in Cleveland, Ohio under the choreography of Michael Medcalf. Native American musical act Shouting Mountain opened the evening. In 2001, Richards followed the success of ENKI with the production of An Occurrence Remembered, influenced by the metaphysical war writings of Ambrose Bierce. The performance premiered in New York City. Richards reflects on the performance: "Rehearsals were underway when 9-11 happened and I recall we continued only for our own therapy of the situation, knowing theater-goers were not going out. It was a tremendous performance, but it financially broke me."

Richards calls his synth music "Dark Electronic Storytelling" as it is conceptually based on written works and is meant for dramatic performance.

Richards announced on social media in June 2018 that he was re-releasing previous albums and upcoming tracks under the new moniker Elder Moon.

Writing career
In 2002, Richards moved to Los Angeles to start over where he refocused his artistic direction into writing and illustrating, which he said: "did not need the expenses of my past but only a pen and paper." While his novel Me’ma and the Great Mountain (2012) began drafts as early as 2002, it was Simon Snootle and Other Small Stories that became his first book release in 2009.

The following year Richards delivered four new releases including his second book of short stories in A Boy Born from Mold and Other Delectable Morsels.

Richards conceptualized most of The Goodbye Family characters in 2009 during a trip to the UK and France with his wife, although they were mentioned before this in his western novel Me’ma and the Great Mountain. Richards explains "I took a diary on the trip to write my second novel The Goodbye Family.

The Goodbye family consisted of undertakers Otis and Pyridine, their daughter Orphie and her pet tarantula Dorian. Orphie was first seen atop the Notre Dame Cathedral with gargoyles, Otis was trying to board a train at customs with a shrunken head, Pyridine was sewing a limb back together in Cardiff, and Dorian was capturing a fairy to eat. Following these illustrations, a cat Ouiji was unveiled and Orphie is said to have a brother named Kepla, but he is hardly ever seen and it is unclear if he even exists."

Between 2009 and 2013, Richards was bookbinding his limited edition versions of each title with runs equaling 50 to 400. These collectible books were typically oversewn by hand with a faux leather hard backing and linen pages inside. In an interview he states:

"Having seen what is being printed by majors these days with poor quality paper, I wanted to provide the reader with a book that carries more value near the same price and that can last for generations. Nothing would be more inspiring to me than to know my books are treasured like an heirloom."

Stylistically, Richards prefers a pencil and ink approach to his illustrations, and his writing often has elements of dark satire. Many of his stories also have a strong environmental message.

Between 2015 and 2018 Richards ran two weekly cartoons on Steamkat, a comic strip site, The Goodbye Family and The Noodle Rut. Richards won the 2016 Official Tasty Nugget award for his illustrated story Sad Lost Doll.  Since 2018, Richards has syndicated his series The Goodbye Family on Tapas as well as through his social media. In 2021, Richards created The Goodbye Family: The Animated Series.

The Goodbye Family

Since 2017, Richards has released his comic collections on a nearly quarterly basis, growing his audience, and solely focusing on The Goodbye Family and his Weird West brand. In an interview in 2019, he announced an early 2020 release of his second novel The Goodbye Family and the Great Mountain.

Producer and Director
Richards has produced and directed several documentaries relating to the American Frontier experience and Welsh American stories. In fiction, Richards created The Goodbye Family: The Animated Series, based on his Weird West characters, which has received such accolades as one of the top ten best animated TV series in 2022 by New York Magazine.

A Raven Above Press
A Raven Above Press was founded in 2009 by Richards with a focus on printing his illustrated stories and promoting other authors and illustrators of Celtic and Native American origin. The press also became a catalyst for producing cultural events and art exhibits. Notably, the Los Angeles St. David's Day Festival. On August 1, 2013, Celtic Family Magazine hit the newsstands with a release party in Cardiff, Wales. Richards was the founder and publisher of Celtic Family Magazine from its inception in 2013 to its hiatus in 2017.

The logo for A Raven Above Press displays a raven atop a bending cypress tree. Model Wednesday Mourning appeared in the main ad for A Raven Above Press, as well as Richards daughter Berlin in her traditional Welsh dress.

Richards would produce a book for every Welsh event he curated through A Raven Above Press. Outside of including his own illustration, these books often had American and Welsh artists depict the subject matter. Notable artists involved were Jen Delyth, Ruth Jên, Siobhan Owen, Monica Richards, Nichola and Sarah Hope, and Nathan Wyburn to name a few. The following is a list of these books: 
 A Welsh Alphabet by Lorin Morgan-Richards and Peter Anthony Freeman (2010) in conjunction with the 2011 West Coast Eisteddfod.
 The Children's Voice: A Definitive Collection of Welsh Nursery Rhymes by Peter Anthony Freeman (2012) in conjunction with the 2012 Los Angeles St. David's Day Festival.
 The Age of Saints by Peter Anthony Freeman (2013) in conjunction with the 2013 Los Angeles St. David's Day Festival.
 Welsh in the Old West by Lorin Morgan-Richards (2015) created for but released after the 2014 Los Angeles St. David's Day Festival.

Native American Involvement
 Richards speaking on the history books he read in grade school: "Usually the pictures told much more about American history than the text. I remembered seeing at a very early age a glowing photo of Custer and a few pages after (of) an elderly man, who looked like my own grandfather, lying dead in the snow. He was alone, and without care. I later found out his name was Miniconjou chief Spotted Elk (Bigfoot) and he was part of the massacre at Wounded Knee. That photo has always stuck with me. I knew something was not right, and the text which was alongside it was not giving the full story."

Bringing the Circle Together

 Between 2008 and 2012, Richards partnered with Native American and Indigenous groups in Los Angeles to establish Bringing the Circle Together, a free monthly film series hosted at the Japanese American National Museum. The series offered a central gathering place to screen documentaries by and about Indigenous people while providing historical narratives with guest speakers, and art and cultural demonstrations. Special guests included Makana, Saginaw Grant, Douglas Miles, Blase Bonpane, among others.

The film series in partnership with AIM Santa Barbara held a community birthday celebration at Nahui Ohlin in Los Angeles for Leonard Peltier on September 12, 2009, with an update on his status and how the public could get involved to petition his release. Richards spoke to a reporter: "This is all grassroots. Everyone's voice counts. The time is now because Barack Obama, our president, had said it's not the president that actually makes the change, it's going to be our pressure upon the president that will make the change." The event was followed in December by a screening of Warrior: The Life of Leonard Peltier with discussion afterward by Ben Carnes, members of AIM Santa Barbara, as well as friends and family.

History was made at the film series on February 25, 2010, at the screening of Lost Nation: The Ioway when representatives of the Southern Ioway and Northern Ioway tribes gathered with Tongva leaders, making it the first time a meeting took place between Southern California and Midwestern Native American Nations.

Celtic involvement

Richards became heavily involved in the Welsh-American community after the closure of the Welsh Presbyterian Church in December 2012. Before this, Richards had helped coordinate an Eisteddfod at Barnsdall Art Park in 2011. Feeling a need to fill the void of losing the church as a cultural center, Richards founded the Los Angeles St. David's Day Festival, an annual event taking place on or around March 1 celebrating Wales. The first festival took place on March 1, 2013. Singer and harpist Siobhan Owen headlined the large-scale event. In conjunction with the festival, Richards began producing Celtic Family Magazine, a nationally distributed print and digital publication on Celtic interests.

Imperfectualism
Imperfectualism is an anti-art treatise by Lorin Morgan-Richards, using the pen name Marcil d’Hirson Garron, and first published in January 2020. Richards defines Impefectualism as art that cannot be easily replicated by machine. An imperfectualist looks to slow automation through their art. The theme of Imperfectualism is the art of being imperfect. Richards used automatic drawing as a means of producing the work where conscious control is suppressed.

Personal life

Beliefs
Richards considers himself a Spiritualist, stating that:

After a lifetime of witnessing spirit communication and most remarkably of that spirit I have seen firsthand, some in very close proximity, I feel I need to announce my path closely aligns with Spiritualism, or more precisely Spiritism and its view of reincarnation. In relation to his art, Richards states: My imagination helps see the past come to life as if watching a theater production put on by spirits.

Works

Bibliography
 Simon Snootle and Other Small Stories (2009) 
 A Boy Born from Mold and Other Delectable Morsels (2010) 
 A Little Hard to Swallow (2010) 
 A Welsh Alphabet (2010), with notes by Peter Anthony Freeman  (in collaboration with other artists)
 The Terribly Mini Monster Book & a Lesser Known Story About a Rare Benign Belbow (2011) 
 Me’ma and the Great Mountain (2012), with foreword by Corine Fairbanks 
 Welsh in the Old West (2015), with foreword by Jude Johnson  (in collaboration with other artists)
 Dark Letter Days: Collected Works (2016) 
 The Night Speaks to Me: A Posthumous Account of Jim Morrison (2016) 
 The People of Turtle Island: Book One in the Series (2016) 
 The Dreaded Summons and Other Misplaced Bills (2017) 
 Imperfectualism (2020) 
 The Goodbye Family and the Great Mountain (2020), with foreword by Richard-Lael Lillard

Comic collections
 13 Disturbing Postcards to Send to Your Grandparents (2010) 
 Memento Mori: The Goodbye Family Album (2017) 
 Wanted: Dead or Alive...but not stinkin''' (2017) 
 The Goodbye Family Unveiled (2017) 
 Down West (2018) 
 Nicklesworth: Featuring the Goodbye Family (2018) 
 Gallows Humor: Hangin' with the Goodbye Family (2018) 
 Dead Man's Hand-kerchief: Dealing with the Goodbye Family (2019) 
 The Importance of Being Otis: Undertaking with the Goodbye Family (2019) 
 Yippee Ki-Yayenne Mother Pepper: Getting Saucy with the Goodbye Family (2019) 
 Pyridine's Fancy: It's a Grave Business with the Goodbye Family (2020) 
 Keeping up with the Boneses: Digging with the Goodbye Family (2020) 
 Family Messings: Getting Dirty with the Goodbye Family (2021) 
 It's Your Funeral: Stitched Up with the Goodbye Family (2022) 

Comic volumes
 The Goodbye Family Jewels: Volume 1 (2020) 

As illustrator only
 The Pied Piper of Hamelin (2012), authored by Robert Browning, colorized by J.A. Pringles
 Plop the Raindrop (2013), authored by Kevin Alan Richards

As Writer only
 Voices Lleisiau (2023), art book curated by Nichola Hope, Dan Langford and Wales Week/London 

Web stories
Richards has created original content and retold classic stories with his illustration for social media.

Original stories
 Sal the Silverfish (2016)
 The Overcooked Tater Tot (2016) 
 The Sad Lost Doll (2016)
 The Tiny Adventure of Hairball Man (2016)
 12 Days of Krampus (2016)

Now That's a Silly Goose
The following are classic stories illustrated by Richards
 Jack and the Beanstalk (2020)
 Aesop's Fables'' (2020)

Discography

Solo studio albums
Albums released under the name Elder Moon or Lorin Morgan-Richards

Compilation albums

Audiobooks
Albums released under the name Lorin Morgan-Richards

Collaborative albums
Albums released with associated acts

Other Collaborative Recordings
EPs and Singles released with associated acts

Filmography

See also

Charles Addams
John M. Crowther
Robert Crumb
Edward Gorey
Gary Larson
Stan Lynde
Angus Oblong
Will Rogers
Shel Silverstein
Marvin Townsend
Gahan Wilson

References

External links

 
 Lorin Morgan-Richards on Twitter
 
 
 

1975 births
21st-century American novelists
21st-century American poets
21st-century American male writers
American children's writers
21st-century American historians
American male short story writers
American male songwriters
American people of Welsh descent
American people of Swiss descent
American Amish people
American cartoonists
American children's book illustrators
American spiritualists
Artists of the American West
Children's poets
American male poets
American male novelists
Western (genre) writers
Singing cowboys
Living people
California State University, Los Angeles alumni
Cuyahoga Community College alumni
Poets from Ohio
People from Lakewood, Ohio
People from Strongsville, Ohio
People from Studio City, Los Angeles
Writers who illustrated their own writing
Novelists from Ohio
People from Medina County, Ohio
21st-century American non-fiction writers
American male non-fiction writers
American comics writers
American webcomic creators
Ufologists
Underground, Inc. artists
Writers of Gothic fiction
Writers with dyslexia
Historians from Ohio
Historians from California